The Norwalk River Valley Trail (NRVT) is a multi-use trail that is under construction. The plan for the trail is to run from Norwalk, Connecticut, to Danbury, Connecticut, stretching about  passing through Redding, Ridgefield and Wilton. The trail currently consists of a  section in Norwalk with the trailheads at Matthews Park and Union Street.  The trail generally follows the Norwalk River.

The trail is controlled by each respective town it passes through. Funding is provided primarily by the state, along with some private donations.

Trail development

The idea for the Norwalk River Valley Trail aroused in 1995 to have a trail run along the Norwalk River. Currently there is only a short segment of the trail complete in Norwalk. The Norwalk and Wilton parts of the trail are owned by the state of Connecticut. The board hopes to receive donations of money and land to obtain this trail but will most likely need to purchase some of the land themselves. In hopes of funding the initial routing for the trail, the Norwalk River Valley Trail committee has applied for a Recreational Trails Grant that is administered by the state. The group plans to finish the trail within 5 years.

Current section

The finished section in Norwalk is a short trail in comparison to the projected finished trail. The 0.7 mile paved trail stretches through a park, a playground and a historical museum. A parking lot is available at the southern trailhead.

External links

 Norwalk River Valley Trail
 Proposed Route
 Rails to Trails Conservancy
 Norwalk River Watershed Association

Rail trails in Connecticut
Transportation in Fairfield County, Connecticut
Geography of Norwalk, Connecticut
Tourist attractions in Norwalk, Connecticut